William Richard Waring (July 4, 1787 – January 2, 1843) was a 19th-century American physician. He was described as one of the "most illustrious physicians" in Savannah, Georgia. The William Waring Property, the oldest extant building in that city's Wright Square, is now named for him.

He server two terms as mayor of Savannah (1830–1832).

His son was fellow physician James Johnston Waring.

Life and career 

Waring was born in 1787 in South Carolina. His father was William Waring Sr. He graduated South Carolina College in 1808, later studying medicine in Charleston, South Carolina.

After further studies at the University of Pennsylvania (graduating in 1813), he served during the War of 1812 as surgeon of the 8th Regiment Infantry, stationed in Savannah, Georgia. He remained in the city for the rest of his life.

In 1821, he wrote Report to the City Council of Savannah on the Epidemic Disease of 1820.

In 1825, he married Anne Johnston, with whom he had four known children: William (born 1827), James (1829), George (1833) and Anna Mary (1836).

As his family expanded, Waring purchased a home at 121–123 West Oglethorpe Avenue in 1832, toward the end of his stints as mayor of Savannah.

Waring was an 1833 co-founder of Savannah's Temperance Society.

Death 
Waring died in 1843, aged 55. He was interred beside his wife, who preceded him in death by seven years, in Savannah's Laurel Grove Cemetery.

Bibliography 

 Report to the City Council of Savannah on the Epidemic Disease of 1820 (1821)

References

External links 

 "Report to City Council - Dr. William R. Waring. 1820 House - Davenport House Museum" – James Credle, YouTube, October 5, 2020

1787 births
1843 deaths
People from South Carolina
People from Savannah, Georgia
Physicians from Georgia (U.S. state)
19th-century American physicians
University of Pennsylvania alumni
American military personnel of the War of 1812
Mayors of Savannah, Georgia